The flame palmette is a motif in decorative art which, in its most characteristic expression, resembles the fan-shaped leaves of a palm tree. Flame palmettes are different from regular palmettes in that, traditionally palmettes tended to have sharply splaying leaves. From the 4th century BCE however, the end of the leaves tend to turn in, forming what is called the "flame palmette" design.

Greece
The first appearance of flame palmettes seem to occur with the stand-alone floral akroteria of the Parthenon (447–432 BCE), and slightly later at the Temple of Athena Nike. Flame palmettes were then introduced into friezes of floral motifs in replacement of the regular palmette. According to John Boardman, although lotus friezes or palmette friezes were known in Mesopotamia centuries before, the unnatural combination of various botanical elements which have no relationship in the wild, such as the palmette, the lotus, and sometimes rosette flowers, is a purely Greek innovation, which was then adopted on a very broad geographical scale.

Asia Minor
In Asia Minor, some of the earliest designs of flaming palmettes can be found in the Mausoleum at Halicarnassus, dated to 350 BCE. They are also extensively used at the 3rd century BCE Ionic Temple of Didyma.

Greco-Bactria
The flame palmette design that was adopted in Hellenistic architecture and became very popular on a wide geographical scale, especially following the conquests of Alexander the Great. In the Greco-Bactrian city of Ai-Khanoum, founded circa 280 BCE, the antefixae display a flame palmette design, as do floral mosaics.

India

This is the design that was adopted by India in the 3rd century BCE for some of its sculptural friezes, such as on the abaci of the Pillars of Ashoka,  or the central design of the Pataliputra capital, probably through the Seleucid Empire or Hellenistic cities such as Ai-Khanoum.

References

External links

Visual motifs
Ornaments (architecture)
Ornaments